Jonathan Bird (born March 1, 1969) is an American photographer, cinematographer, director and television host. He is best known for his role as the host of Jonathan Bird's Blue World, a family-friendly underwater exploration program on public television in the United States. His work is largely underwater in nature.

Underwater photography 
Bird learned to scuba dive while in college at Worcester Polytechnic Institute and combined his interest in photography with diving. His first underwater photographs were made in the waters of Massachusetts. He worked as an electrical engineer for several years until leaving his position to pursue underwater photography full-time in 1993.  He became a freelance underwater photographer, working for magazines including Sport Diver and Skin Diver. His first book, Beneath the North Atlantic, a collection of his favorite images from the waters of New England, was published in 1997 by Tide-mark Press.  He is the author of 7 books and his images have appeared in top nature publications including National Geographic Magazine, National Wildlife Magazine and BBC Wildlife Magazine.

Cinematography 
Bird formed Oceanic Research Group, Inc. in 1991 to produce educational ocean-related materials.  Oceanic Research Group became a 501(c)(3) non-profit organization in 1993. Oceanic Research Group's first underwater film was produced in 1992 for the educational market and was distributed by AIMS Media, which has since been acquired by Discovery Education. Bird and Oceanic Research Group have made 13 educational films for use in schools about ocean topics since then, the most recent being Sharks: Predators with a Purpose in 2007.

His first television film, Sharks: The Real Story, co-produced with longtime collaborator Art Cohen, was completed in 1995 and aired on PBS. Bird is fond of sharks as a subject matter and has made 5 films about sharks. In 2005, Bird completed his first film for National Geographic Channel, called Sharks: Deep Trouble. His broadcast work has earned Bird 9 Emmy awards and 2 CINE Golden Eagle awards.  He cites Howard Hall as a major influence in his cinematography.  He directed the IMAX film Ancient Caves, distributed by MacGillivray Freeman Films, in 2020.

Jonathan Bird’s Blue World 

The pilot for Jonathan Bird's Blue World was completed in 2001 and shopped around without success for several years. The project was dropped while Bird worked on several broadcast documentaries. In 2007, without a television buyer, the first few episodes were put on the web. After gaining a fan base there, NETA offered Jonathan Bird’s Blue World distribution to U.S. public television.  Four seasons (through 2014) were eventually distributed to public television through NETA. The series (now in season 8) is distributed to international television exclusively by FusionTV. Beginning in 2012, shorter versions of the program were made available on YouTube. The channel has grown to over 1 million subscribers.

Personal life 
Bird lives in Massachusetts with his wife Christine and two children. He plays guitar in The Wetsuits, a rock band made up of all professional underwater photographers including Michel Gilbert, Danielle Alary, Michael Lawrence, and Paul Cater Deaton.  He is a member of the Wyland Ocean Artist Society and a 2019 inductee of the International Scuba Diving Hall of fame.

References

External links 
 Jonathan Bird's Curriculum Vitae
 Oceanic Research Group
• Jonathan Bird's Blue World

Living people
1969 births
American photographers
American underwater divers
Underwater photographers
People from North Reading, Massachusetts
Place of birth missing (living people)
Worcester Polytechnic Institute alumni